Marie-Laure Delie (born 29 January 1988) is a French football player who currently plays for Madrid CFF of the Primera Division. She plays as a striker and is a member of the France women's national football team having made her debut for the team on 23 September 2009.

Club career

Early career
Delie began her career playing for Olympique Viarmes Asnières, just north of her birthplace. After five years at the club, she joined Domont FC, In 2005, Delie being selected to the CNFE Clairefontaine, the women's section of the prestigious Clairefontaine academy. She spent two seasons with the team making 37 appearances and scoring 19 goals. Before the 2007–2008 season, Delie drew interest from both Division 1 Féminine clubs Montpellier and Paris Saint-Germain. She eventually agreed to join the latter club. In her only one season at the club, she played in all of the club's league matches and scored 16 goals.

Montpellier
After a successful season at Paris Saint-Germain, Montpellier remained keen on signing the young striker. In June 2008, Delie reached an agreement to sign with the club and was handed the number 23 shirt by manager Sarak M'Barek. In her first season with Montpellier, she scored a team-leading 19 goals and helped the club win the 2008–09 Challenge de France. Delie remained potent on the field of play in the 2009–10 season as Montpellier were not only playing in domestic competitions, but also in the 2009–10 edition of the UEFA Women's Champions League. She finished as the second-best scorer in the league behind Eugénie Le Sommer after netting 18 in 20 league matches.

In the team's defense of the Challenge de France, Delie scored a team-high six goals in five matches as Montpellier reached the final for the second consecutive season. The club was unable to defend its title though losing 5–0 to Delie's former club Paris Saint-Germain in the final. In the Champions League, Delie scored three goals in the first qualifying rounds in wins over Bulgarian club NSA Sofia and Macedonian outfit ZFK Tikvesanka. In the Round of 32, Delie scored the team's final goal in a 3–1 second leg victory over the women's section of Belgian club Standard Liège. Montpellier were later defeated in the quarter-finals by Swedish club Umeå. Delie ultimately finished the season with 34 total appearances and a team-leading 28 goals.

In the 2010–11 season, Delie appeared as all 22 league matches scoring 14 goals. In the cup, despite scoring only one goal as the lead striker, Montpellier still reached the final for the third consecutive season. The club, however, failed to live up to its 2008 performance falling on penalties to Saint-Étienne.

Paris Saint-Germain
In July 2013, she signed with PSG.

International career
Delie has been active with the women's section of the national team. She has earned caps with the women's under-17, under-19, and under-20 teams. At under-19 level, Delie made 23 appearances and helped the team reach the final at the 2007 UEFA Women's Under-19 Championship, where they lost to Germany. Delie finished the competition as one of its joint top-scorers.

On 23 September 2009, Delie earned her first cap with the senior women's national team against Croatia. On her debut, she scored her first international goal in a 7–0 away win. In her following match with the team, against Estonia, she scored a double. France won the match 12–0. Delie quickly settled in with the team and finished the 2011 FIFA Women's World Cup qualification round with nine goals. In the 2011 Cyprus Cup, Delie scored a tournament-high six goals. Her goals were courtesy of separate hat tricks in wins over New Zealand and Scotland. On 15 June 2011, in a preparation friendly ahead of the 2011 FIFA Women's World Cup, Delie scored both team goals in a 2–1 win over Belgium. In the return friendly against Belgium on 18 June, Delie netted a hat trick in a 7–0 win. The treble was her third in the team's last five matches. She scored the only goal of the opening match of the World Cup against Nigeria at the Rhein-Neckar Arena, converting at close range from a cross by Eugénie Le Sommer, and also netted in the final group game against the hosts Germany, as France came fourth.

She was part of France's team at the 2012 Summer Olympics, scoring two goals in the group stages. She also played in the 2016 Olympics.

At the 2015 World Cup in Canada, Delie opened a 5–0 group stage win over Mexico which sent France through as group winners, her goal came after 34 seconds. In the last 16 against South Korea at the Olympic Stadium in Montreal, she struck in each half of a 3–0 victory.

Career statistics

Club
Updated 1 September 2016

International

(Correct as of 1 September 2016)

International goals

Honours

Club
Montpellier
Challenge de France: Winner 2008–09

International
France
Cyprus Cup: Winner 2012, 2014
SheBelieves Cup: Winner 2017

See also
 List of women's footballers with 100 or more caps

References

External links

 Club profile
 
 
 FFF profile 

1988 births
Living people
French women's footballers
French sportspeople of Ivorian descent
France women's youth international footballers
France women's international footballers
Paris Saint-Germain Féminine players
CNFE Clairefontaine players
Montpellier HSC (women) players
Footballers at the 2012 Summer Olympics
Footballers at the 2016 Summer Olympics
Olympic footballers of France
2011 FIFA Women's World Cup players
2015 FIFA Women's World Cup players
People from Villiers-le-Bel
Women's association football forwards
FIFA Century Club
Division 1 Féminine players
Black French sportspeople
Footballers from Val-d'Oise
French expatriate sportspeople in Spain
Expatriate women's footballers in Spain
UEFA Women's Euro 2017 players
French expatriate women's footballers